Agnimitra was the second king of the Shunga dynasty of northern India. He succeeded his father, Pushyamitra Shunga, in 149 BCE. The Vayu Purana and the Brahmanda Purana have assigned 8 years as the length of his reign.

Ancestry and early life
According to Kālidāsa in the Mālavikāgnimitram (Act IV, Verse 14), Agnimitra belonged to the Brahmin Baimbika family, the Puranas also mention him as a Shunga. The Mālavikāgnimitra, (Act V, Verse 20) informs us that he was the Goptri (viceroy) at Vidisha during his father's reign.

The Mālavikāgnimitra gives us the names of three of his queens: Dharini (the mother of the fourth Shunga King, Vasumitra), Iravati, and Malavika (a princess of Vidarbha).

Vidarbha conquest of Agnimitra

Battle of Vidarbha 

According to the Mālavikāgnimitra (Act I, Verse 6-8 and Act V, Verse 13–14), a war broke out between the Shungas and neighboring Vidarbha kingdom during Agnimitra's reign as viceroy of Vidisha (between 175 to 150 BCE). Before the rise of the Shungas, Vidarbha had become independent from the Mauryan Empire when a former Mauryan  (minister) put his brother-in-law Yajnasena on the throne. Madhavasena, a cousin of Yajnasena, sought help from Agnimitra in overthrowing his cousin, but was captured while crossing the border of Vidarbha and imprisoned.

Agnimitra demanded the release of Madhavasena, and in return Yajnasena demanded the release of the former Mauryan minister, who had been captured earlier by Agnimitra. Instead, Agnimitra sent his army to invade Vidarbha. Yajnasena was defeated and forced to divide Vidarbha with Madhavasena, and both cousins recognized the suzerainty of the Shunga rulers.

Succession
Agnimitra succeeded his father in 149 BCE and ruled for 8 years. His reign ended in 141 BCE and he was succeeded either by his son Vasujyeshtha (according to the Matsya Purana) or Sujyeshtha (according to the Vayu, Brahamānda, Vishnu, and Bhagavata Puranas).

Further reading
Indigenous States of Northern India (Circa 200 BC to 320 AD) by Bela Lahiri, University of Calcutta,1974.

References

External links
List of rulers of Magadha on Bruce Gordon's *"Regnal Chronologies".

Shunga Empire
2nd-century BC Indian monarchs